The 2000 FIA GT Silverstone 500 km was the fourth round the 2000 FIA GT Championship season.  It took place at the Silverstone Circuit, United Kingdom, on May 14, 2000.  This event shared the weekend with the American Le Mans Series' Silverstone 500 USA Challenge, with some teams participating in both events.

Official results
Class winners in bold.  Cars failing to complete 70% of winner's distance marked as Not Classified (NC).

Statistics
 Pole position – #14 Lister Storm Racing – 1:48.653
 Fastest lap – #14 Lister Storm Racing – 1:50.233
 Average speed – 159.792 km/h

References

 
 
 

S
FIA GT Silverstone